Phellinus ferruginosus is a plant pathogen. It is inedible.

References

External links 
 Index Fungorum
 USDA ARS Fungal Database

Fungal plant pathogens and diseases
Hymenochaetales
Inedible fungi
Taxa named by Heinrich Schrader (botanist)